Diane Moy Quon (born in Chicago) is an American film producer. She previously worked in marketing for NBC and Paramount Pictures, before joining Kartemquin Films and transitioning into documentary film production. She received an Academy Award nomination for Minding the Gap.

Filmography
 Minding the Gap, (2018)
 Circle of Iris (short), (2019)
 Down a Dark Stairwell, (2019)
 The Dilemma of Desire, (2020)
 Finding Yingying, (2020)
 Left-Handed Pianist, (2020)
 Wuhan Wuhan, (2020)
  Surf Nation, (2022)
 Bad Axe, (2022)

References

American film producers
Year of birth missing (living people)
Living people